Oberhof may refer to:

Oberhof, Germany, a village and resort in Thuringia
Oberhof bobsleigh, luge, and skeleton track, located in Oberhof, Germany
Oberhof, Switzerland, a village in the canton of Aargau

See also
Oberhofen (disambiguation)